Marshall is a town in Rusk County, Wisconsin, United States. The population was 683 at the 2000 census.

Geography
According to the United States Census Bureau, the town has a total area of 35.8 square miles (92.6 km2), all land.

History
In October, 1852 a survey crew working for the U.S. government marked all the section corners in the six mile square which would become Marshall, walking through the woods and swamps, measuring with chain and compass. When done, the deputy surveyors filed this general description:
This Township contains some Tamarac Swamp, all of which is unfit for cultivation.  Some Hay meadow from which Hay may be cut.  The Surface is generally level.  That(?) that may be considered upland, and Compare favourably with 2nd(?) rate land in(?) any(?) Country.  Covered with white and yellow Birch, Sugar, Maple, Elm, Ash And some Pine, some places Hemlock mostly.

Demographics
As of the census of 2000, there were 683 people, 210 households, and 170 families residing in the town.  The population density was 19.1 people per square mile (7.4/km2).  There were 228 housing units at an average density of 6.4 per square mile (2.5/km2).  The racial makeup of the town was 95.90% White, 0.15% African American, 2.34% Native American, 0.59% from other races, and 1.02% from two or more races. Hispanic or Latino of any race were 1.02% of the population.

There were 210 households, out of which 43.3% had children under the age of 18 living with them, 67.1% were married couples living together, 7.1% had a female householder with no husband present, and 18.6% were non-families. 15.7% of all households were made up of individuals, and 10.0% had someone living alone who was 65 years of age or older.  The average household size was 3.25 and the average family size was 3.63.

In the town, the population was spread out, with 38.9% under the age of 18, 5.4% from 18 to 24, 26.5% from 25 to 44, 15.4% from 45 to 64, and 13.8% who were 65 years of age or older.  The median age was 31 years. For every 100 females, there were 95.1 males.  For every 100 females age 18 and over, there were 101.4 males.

The median income for a household in the town was $33,281, and the median income for a family was $36,319. Males had a median income of $25,729 versus $21,094 for females. The per capita income for the town was $11,411.  About 13.8% of families and 16.9% of the population were below the poverty line, including 19.3% of those under age 18 and 14.4% of those age 65 or over.

References

Towns in Rusk County, Wisconsin
Towns in Wisconsin